Alexandra Komarnycky (born October 5, 1989) is a Canadian competitive swimmer.  At the 2008 Olympics, she competed in the women's 400 m individual medley, finishing in 29th place.  At the 2012 Summer Olympics, she competed in the women's 800-metre freestyle, finishing in 11th place overall in the heats, but failing to qualify for the event final.

References

External links 
 
 

1989 births
Living people
Canadian female freestyle swimmers
Olympic swimmers of Canada
Swimmers from Toronto
Swimmers at the 2008 Summer Olympics
Swimmers at the 2012 Summer Olympics
21st-century Canadian women